Rani Sipri's Mosque (Gujarati: રાણી સિપ્રીની મસ્જીદ) also known as Rani Sipri ni Masjid or Masjid-e-nagina, formerly known as Rani Asni's Mosque, is a medieval mosque in the walled city of Ahmedabad, Gujarat in India. This mosque was commissioned in 1514 by Queen Sipri, the Hindu wife of Mahmud Begada, a sultan who ruled Gujarat. It is also known as Masjid-e-Nagina (Jewel of a Mosque) because of the intricate jali carvings on its walls. In 2006-7, the Ahmedabad Municipal Corporation proposed demolishing part of the monument in order to expand a road.

Construction
The mosque is named after the Hindu queen of Sultan Mahmud Begada, Rani Sipri. The queen commissioned this mosque in 1514. After her death, the queen was buried in this mosque. Inside, there is also a jenana, a separate area for women to worship.

Architecture

The jali screen work that includes flowing plants and trees is the prime attraction of this monument. Similar intricate jali work can be seen in other Islamic architectural monuments in the city like Siddi Sayyed Jali and Sarkhej Roza.

Gallery

References 

Religious buildings and structures completed in 1514
1514 in India
Mosques in Ahmedabad
Monuments of National Importance in Gujarat